Gnophodes grogani is a butterfly in the family Nymphalidae. It is found in the Democratic Republic of the Congo (from the eastern part of the country to Kivu), western Uganda, and possibly Rwanda and Burundi.

References

Butterflies described in 1901
Melanitini